Red Shirt Table is a table mountain in Oglala Lakota County, South Dakota part of the Pine Ridge Indian Reservation of the Oglala Sioux Tribe. The top surface of the table slopes gently downhill as it extends northward, with the north edge being at about 2,800' in elevation. It drops off steeply from almost all sides, up to 300'. French Creek flows to the northeast, and the intermittent Cedar Creek drains the entire east side of the table.

Red Shirt Table is one of many tables in the White River Badlands; others include Cuny Table, Sheep Mountain Table, and Heck Table.

The Oglala Lakota community of Red Shirt, located below the north end of the table (in the Cheyenne River valley), is the village of Pine Ridge Indian Reservation closest to Rapid City, South Dakota and has grown in recent years.

Notes

External links
 Badland Nat'l Park map

Tables (landform)
Highest points of United States national parks
Protected areas of Oglala Lakota County, South Dakota
Badlands National Park
Mountains of South Dakota